Daughter of the Dragon is a 1931 American pre-Code crime mystery film directed by Lloyd Corrigan, released by Paramount Pictures, and starring Anna May Wong as Princess Ling Moy, Sessue Hayakawa as Ah Kee, and Warner Oland as Dr. Fu Manchu (for his third and final feature appearance in the role, excluding a gag cameo in Paramount on Parade). The film was made to capitalize on Sax Rohmer's then current book, The Daughter of Fu Manchu, which Paramount did not own the rights to adapt. Despite being the starring lead and having top billing in this film, Wong was paid only $6,000, half the money for her role that Oland was paid for his, even though Oland had less screen time than Wong. In a 2020 article about Wong, O, The Oprah Magazine linked this discrepancy to racism.

Plot
Princess Ling Moy lives next door to the Petrie family, and is romantically involved with Ah Kee, a secret agent determined to thwart Fu Manchu. It is revealed that Fu Manchu is Ling Moy's father. At her Chinese father's bidding, Princess Ling Moy goes to murder an enemy and meets a Scotland Yard detective.

Cast
 Anna May Wong as Princess Ling Moy
 Warner Oland as Dr. Fu Manchu
 Sessue Hayakawa as Ah Kee
 Bramwell Fletcher as Ronald Petrie
 Frances Dade as Joan Marshall
 Holmes Herbert as Sir John Petrie
 Lawrence Grant as Sir Basil Courtney
 Harold Minjir as Rogers
 Nicholas Soussanin as Morloff
 E. Alyn Warren as Lu Chung
 Wong Chung as Henchman (uncredited) 
 Olaf Hytten as Flinders the Butler (uncredited)

See also
 The House That Shadows Built (1931 promotional film by Paramount with an excerpt from this film)

References

External links

 
 
 

1931 films
1931 crime films
1931 mystery films
American black-and-white films
American mystery films
Films directed by Lloyd Corrigan
Paramount Pictures films
Films with screenplays by Sidney Buchman
American crime films
Fu Manchu films
1930s English-language films
1930s American films